The Cumberland Presbyterian Church is a historic church at the junction of Race and Spring Streets in Searcy, Arkansas.  It is a single-story buff brick Romanesque Revival structure, with a cross-gable roof configuration and a square tower at the right front corner.  The tower houses the main entrance in a pointed-arch recess, and has a louvered belfry at the second level below the pyramidal roof.  The church was built in 1903 for a congregation organized in 1824, and is a fine example of Romanesque and Classical Revival architecture.

The building was listed on the National Register of Historic Places in 1992.

See also
National Register of Historic Places listings in White County, Arkansas

References

Presbyterian churches in Arkansas
Churches on the National Register of Historic Places in Arkansas
Romanesque Revival church buildings in Arkansas
Neoclassical architecture in Arkansas
Churches completed in 1903
Churches in White County, Arkansas
Cumberland Presbyterian Church
National Register of Historic Places in Searcy, Arkansas
Neoclassical church buildings in the United States
1903 establishments in Arkansas